John William Leftwich (September 7, 1826 – March 6, 1870) was an American politician and a member of the United States House of Representatives for the 8th congressional district of Tennessee. He was born in Liberty (now Bedford), Virginia in Bedford County on September 7, 1826. He attended public school, studied medicine, and graduated from Philadelphia Medical College in 1850. He moved to Memphis, Tennessee and engaged in mercantile pursuits.

Upon the readmission of Tennessee to representation, he was elected as an Unionist to the Thirty-ninth Congress. He served from July 24, 1866 to March 3, 1867 and was an unsuccessful candidate for re-election. He was a delegate to the Democratic National Convention in 1868. He was mayor of Memphis in 1869 and 1870. He contested the election of William J. Smith to the Forty-first Congress, but while on his way to Washington to prosecute the contest, he died in Lynchburg, Virginia on March 6, 1870. He was interred in Elmwood Cemetery in Memphis.

References

1826 births
1870 deaths
People from Bedford, Virginia
Unconditional Union Party members of the United States House of Representatives from Tennessee
Tennessee Democrats
Tennessee Unconditional Unionists
Mayors of Memphis, Tennessee
19th-century American politicians
Members of the United States House of Representatives from Tennessee